Cremnoconchus carinatus is a species of freshwater snail, an aquatic gastropod mollusk in the family Littorinidae, the winkles or periwinkles.

Distribution
This species is endemic to the Western Ghats range, in India.

The type locality for this species is streams in Mahabaleshwar Hills, the Western Ghats range, India.

Description 
In 1869 Cremnoconchus carinatus was originally discovered and described from a juvenile shell (under the name Anculotus carinatus) by the English naturalist Edgar Leopold Layard in 1854. Layard's original text (the type description) reads as follows:

In 1869, another English naturalist, William Thomas Blanford, moved this species to the newly created genus Cremnoconchus.

In the adult shell the last whorl is angulate below the suture and at the periphery. The shell is imperforate, ovately conical, with the apex eroded. The width of the shell is 5.5 mm. The height of the shell is 8 mm.

References
This article incorporates public domain text from references

Littorinidae
Gastropods described in 1854